A limb is a jointed, muscled appendage of a human or tetrapod animal used for terrestrial locomotion. Tetrapods use limbs for weight-bearing and actions such as walking, running and jumping, swimming, grasping and climbing. The distalmost portion of a limb is known as its extremity. The limbs' bony endoskeleton, known as the appendicular skeleton, is homologous among all tetrapods.

All tetrapods have four limbs that are organized into two bilaterally symmetrical pairs, with one pair at each end of the torso. The cranial pair (closer to the head) are known as the forelimbs or front legs, and the caudal pair (closer to the lower end) are the hindlimbs or back legs. In animals with more bipedal posture (mainly hominid primates, particularly humans), the forelimbs and hindlimbs are often called upper and lower limbs, respectively. The fore-/upper limbs are connected to the thoracic cage via the shoulder girdles, and the hind-/lower limbs are connected to the pelvis via the hip joints. Many animals, especially the arboreal species, have prehensile forelimbs adapted for grasping and climbing, while some (birds and bats) have expanded forelimbs (and sometimes hindlimbs as well) with specialized feathers or membranes to achieve lift and fly. Some animals (mostly primates) can also use hindlimbs for grasping.

In human anatomy, the upper and lower limbs are commonly known as the arms and legs respectively, although in academic usage, these terms refer specifically to the upper arm and lower leg. The human arms have relatively great ranges of motion and are highly adapted for grasping and for carrying objects. The extremity of each arm, known as the hand, specializes in intrinsic and digital fine motor skills for precise manipulation of objects. The human legs and their extremities — the feet — are specialized for bipedal locomotion. Compared to most other mammals that walk and run on all four limbs, human limbs are proportionally weaker but very mobile and versatile, and the unique  dexterity of the human upper extremities allows them to make sophisticated tools and machines that compensate for the lack of physical strength and endurance.

Terminology 
Limb comes from the Old English lim, meaning "body part".

The overall patterns of the forelimbs and hindlimbs are so similar ancestrally, and branch out in similar ways; that they are given shared names. Limbs are attached to the pectoral girdle or pelvic girdle. The one bony element of the upper limb is the stylopodium, the two bones of the lower limb are the zeugopodium. The distal portion of the limbs, that is, the hands or feet, are known as autopodia. Hands are technically known as the manus, and feet as the pes, which are both composed of carpals and digits. As metapodials, the metacarpals and metatarsals are analogous to each other.

Development 

Limb development is controlled by Hox genes. All jawed vertebrates surveyed so far organize their developing limb buds in a similar way. Growth occurs from proximal to distal part of the limb. On the distal end, the differentiation of skeletal elements occurs in an apical ectodermal ridge (AER) which expands in rays. A Zone of Polarizing Activity (ZPA) at the rear part of the AER coordinates the differentiation of digits.

See also 

Anatomical terms of location
Anatomical terms of motion
Orthosis
Phantom limb
Descending limb of loop of Henle
Ascending limb of loop of Henle

References